Joachim Witt (born 22 February 1949) is a German rock musician and actor.

Biography 

Witt was the guitarist/singer in the 1970s krautrock band Duesenberg. He released three albums with them, Duesenberg (1977), Duesenberg 2 (1978) and Strangers (1979), before embarking on a solo career as a singer and actor.

Witt became a major star of the German pop scene during the 1980s with huge hits such as "Goldener Reiter". He was one of the biggest names of the "Neue Deutsche Welle" (New German Wave), of which performers like Nena and Falco were also a part.

He made a big comeback at the end of the 1990s, when he scored a major hit with "Die Flut", a duet with Peter Heppner, the singer of popular German synthpop group Wolfsheim. Witt's album "Bayreuth 1" (1998) went platinum in Germany and Austria. "Bayreuth 2" followed two years later. He has collaborated with such artists as Apocalyptica, Oomph!, Angelzoom, Tilo Wolff of Lacrimosa and just recently, German electropop group Purwien as well.

In 2000, Journey of Life, released by X-Perience, featured a duet with Witt called "The Meaning of Life".

Witt also contributed the song "Vandemar" to the 2006 album Where's Neil When You Need Him?, a compilation of songs based on the works of author Neil Gaiman. "Vandemar" is based on a character from Gaiman's novel Neverwhere.

Witt was featured in Angelzoom's 2004 video "Back in the Moment" and in 2007 with Purwien's video "Alle Fehler" (All Errors).

Witt's "best-of" album titled Auf Ewig was released on 31 August 2007. It contains 16 tracks of some of his current and past work but with more of the hard-hitting Bayreuth 3 sound. Also inside is a bonus DVD containing music videos and interviews. To celebrate the release of Auf Ewig, Witt released two new videos of his biggest hits from the 1980s, "Goldener Reiter" and "Herbergsvater". Two million copies of the album have been sold.

2009–present 
Witt remixed songs from various bands, including Sara Noxx's single "Earth Song". His next contribution was a remix to a song from Obszon Geschopf's album Erection Body Mutilated (Back from the Dead) that was released in April 2009.

On 12 March 2009, Witt announced on his official MySpace that the Bayreuth Trilogy had ended and all that he provided was that "New projects will take place in the near future."

Witt also contributed to the Dorian Hunter play by creating the Dorian Hunter 2009 Theme which is available worldwide on iTunes.

In May 2009, Witt confirmed that he is working on his thirteenth album, which is titled Retromania and is currently unknown when the album will be released as it has been delayed.

The Joachim Witt forums and the official Facebook page has confirmed that the album Retromania had been cancelled, but Witt had stated himself that there already is an album in the works and is slated for release, sometime in Autumn of 2012.

On 28 September 2012, Witt released his anticipated album DOM; this was his first album in nearly seven years. The single, "Gloria", Witt refers to a third milestone of his work after The Golden Rider and The Flood.

On 25 April 2014, Witt released the album Neumond. It returns to the Pop sound.

Witt announced his 15th album on 13 December 2014. Titled Ich, it was funded by Pledgemusic and was released in April 2015.

Discography

Studio albums 
 Silberblick (1980)
 Edelweiß (1982)
 Märchenblau (1983)
 Mit Rucksack und Harpune (1985)
 Moonlight Nights (1985)
 10 Millionen Partys (1988)
 Kapitän der Träume (1992)
 Bayreuth 1 (1998)
 Bayreuth 2 (2000)
 Eisenherz (2002)
 Pop (2004)
 Bayreuth 3 (2006)
 DOM (2012)
 Neumond (2014)
 Ich (2015)
 Thron (2016)
 Rübezahl (2018)
 Rübezahls Rückkehr (2020)
 Rübezahls Reise (2022)

Live albums 
 Live in der Berliner Philharmonie (2002)
 Live at Secret Garden (2005)
Wir (2015)
Refugium (2019)

Compilation albums 
 Goldener Reiter (1996)
Das Beste von Joachim Witt (1998)
 The Platinum Collection (2006)
 Auf Ewig (2007)

Singles 
 1981: Goldener Reiter
 1981: Kosmetik
 1982: Herbergsvater
 1983: Märchenblau
 1983: Hörner in der Nacht
 1984: Wieder bin ich nicht geflogen
 1984: Das Supergesicht
 1985: Blonde Kuh
 1986: How will I Know
 1987: Mad News
 1988: Engel sind zart
 1988: Pet Shop Boy
 1988: Der Tankwart heißt Lou
 1989: Herbergsvater Mix ´90
 1990: Goldener Reiter -Thorsten Fenslau Remix
 1991: Hallo Deutschland
 1992: Das kann doch einen Seemann nicht erschüttern
 1992: Restlos
 1992: In die falsche Welt geboren
 1992: Kapitän der Träume
 1994: Goldener Reiter Remix ´94
 1995: Goldener Raver
 1997: Das geht tief
 1998: Die Flut
 1998: Und ... ich lauf
 1999: Das geht Tief
 2000: Bataillon d´Amour
 2002: Eisenherz
 2002: Supergestört und Superversaut
 2004: Erst wenn das Herz nicht mehr aus Stein ist
 2005: Back in the Moment (with Angelzoom)
 2006: Sternenlicht
 2007: Alle Fehler (with Purwien)
 2009: Dorian Hunter Theme
2009: Kosmetik
2009: Ja, ja...
2009: Goldener Reiter
2009: Mein Schatten
2012: Gloria
2013: Kein Weg zu Weit
2014: Mein Herz
2014: Die Erde brennt
2015: Hände Hoch
2015: Über das Meer
2016: Terrorist der Liebe (with Hubert Kah)
2018: Aufstehen
2020: Die Rückkehr

References

External links 

 Official website
 IMDb: Joachim Witt
 Article about Joachim Witt (in German)
 Fansite (in German)

1949 births
Living people
Musicians from Hamburg
German industrial musicians
German rock musicians
German new wave musicians
German male singers
Aufstehen
Neue Deutsche Welle groups